Mark Lester Pattison (born December 13, 1961) is a former American football wide receiver who played four seasons in the National Football League for the Los Angeles Raiders, Los Angeles Rams, and New Orleans Saints.  He played college football at the University of Washington in Seattle.

High school
Born and raised in Seattle, Pattison graduated from its Roosevelt High School in 1980. Playing as a wide receiver as a junior and at quarterback as a senior for the Rough Riders, he was the Player of the Year as voted on by the Seattle Post-Intelligencer newspaper.

College
Pattison was a three-year letterman at the University of Washington in Seattle under head coach Don James. His senior year concluded in the New Year's night 1985 Orange Bowl in which he caught the go-ahead touchdown. He was selected in the seventh round of the 1985 NFL Draft by the Los Angeles Raiders. In 2016, Pattison's 1984 team was inducted into the Husky Hall of Fame.

After football
Following his NFL career, Pattison took up mountain climbing.  In 2013, he began a goal to climb the Seven Summits, the highest points on each of the seven continents. His successful ascents include Mount Kilimanjaro (Tanzania) (5,895 m (19,341 ft)) in 2013 and 2017, Mount Elbrus (Russia) (5,642 m (18,510 ft)) in 2014, Mount Kosciuszko (Australia) (2,228 m (7,310 ft)) in 2015, and Aconcagua (Argentina) (6,961 m (22,838 ft)) in February, 2016, Denali (Alaska) (6,190 m (20,310 ft)) in 2018, Vinson Massif (Antarctica) (4,892 m (16,050 ft)) in 2019, and Everest (8,848.86 m (29,031.7 ft)) on 23 May 2021.

At 10:10am Nepal Time on 23 May 2021, Mark reached the peak of Mt. Everest to complete his epic adventure to scale the Seven Summits. After an 18-hour grueling climb up and back, Mark completed a long-held dream. Along the way, he also raised awareness and funds for Epilepsy Foundation in honor of his daughter Emilia, as well as Higher Ground, an organization that supports veterans, while achieving his long-held goal to climb all Seven Summits.

In May 2017 Pattison founded and is currently the host of the Finding Your Summit podcast, where he interviews individuals who have overcome great obstacles. The podcast has over 200 episodes.

On 23 September 2021, at 7:00pm MT, Argyros Performing Arts Center in Ketchum, Idaho, presented an NFL exclusive inside view of Mark's historic Everest climb along with his motivations and personal challenges. The feature is titled "Searching For The Summit by NFL360."

NFL360 Produced "Searching for the Summit" which was nominated for 2 EMMYS.  Best Picture, short documentary and Best Cinematography.  On May 24th, 2022 Mark won the EMMY for BEST PICTURE.

Mark currently is an executive for Sports Illustrated and helped to take the parent company, The Arena Group public onto the New York Stock Exchange.  The stock symbol trades under AREN.

References

External links
 
 Weekly podcast Finding Your Summit
 NFL Network's Life After Football: Mark Pattison 
 Where are they now? Seattle Post-Intelligencer
 How a Former NFL Receiver Can Teach Us a Thing or Two About Catching Joy 
  
 
 NFL News 

1961 births
Living people
American football wide receivers
Los Angeles Raiders players
Los Angeles Rams players
New Orleans Saints players
Washington Huskies football players
Players of American football from Seattle
American podcasters